Muhammad Gopi Rizqi Rama Chandra (born 15 December 1989 in Kuantan, Pahang) is a Malaysian footballer who plays as a winger for Malaysia Super League club Penang, on loan from Sarawak United.

Club career

Johor Darul Ta'zim
On 27 December 2016, Gopinathan signed a contract with Johor Darul Ta'zim from Selangor for an undisclosed fee. He made his debut in a 7–0 victory against Melaka United on 9 April 2017. Overall, Gopinathan only played in five matches for the club, three in the AFC Cup and two in the Malaysia Super League with a total duration of 286 minutes. He scored one goal in AFC Cup over Magwe.

Melaka United
On 21 November 2017, Gopinathan was loaned to Melaka United on a season-long loan move from Johor Darul Ta'zim. Gopinathan made his debut in a 2–1 win over Kelantan coming from the bench on 3 February 2018. On 11 February, he scored his first league goal in a 3–0 win over Negeri Sembilan at home. Gopinathan scored two more goals in a league match to help his club beat Kedah on 10 July. On 18 July, he scored the first goal in Melaka's 2–2 draw against Pahang.

International career
In October 2012, Gopinathan is among the national team's recruits for the friendly against Hong Kong at Mong Kok Stadium, Mong Kok, Hong Kong.

The 23-year-old from Kuantan has been in top form for Pahang, having scored three goals in the 2012 Malaysia Premier League and help Pahang gain promotion to 2013 Malaysia Super League and 1 goal in 2012 Malaysia Cup but lost in quarter-finals beaten by Singapore LIONSXII.

National coach Datuk K. Rajagopal at that time, was preparing the team for the 2012 AFF Suzuki Cup in November.

Style of play
Gopinathan known as the lightning sprinter because of his speed and dribbling ability on the field and can use both feet to cross the ball.

Personal life
On 9 October 2019, he converted to Islam and took the Islamic name Muhammad Gopi Rizqi Rama Chandra, so that he can marry his Malay Muslim wife. The pair have a daughter together.

Career statistics

Club

International

Honours

Club
Pahang
 Malaysia FA Cup: 2014
 Malaysia Cup: 2013, 2014
 Malaysia Charity Shield: 2014

Johor Darul Ta'zim
 Malaysia Super League: 2017
 Malaysia Cup: 2017

References

External links

1989 births
Living people
Malaysia Super League players
Malaysian footballers
Shahzan Muda FC players
Sri Pahang FC players
Selangor FA players
Sarawak United FC players
People from Pahang
Malaysian people of Indian descent
Converts to Islam
Malaysia international footballers
Association football wingers